Martin Township is one of ten townships in Crawford County, Illinois, USA.  As of the 2010 census, its population was 531 and it contained 231 housing units.

Geography

Unincorporated towns
 Green Brier
 Hardinville
 Pierceburg
(This list is based on USGS data and may include former settlements.)

Cemeteries
The township contains these five cemeteries: Berlin, Hardinville, Jones, Prior Grove and Richart.

Demographics

School districts
 Oblong Community Unit School District 4
 Red Hill Community Unit School District 10
 Robinson Community Unit School District 2

Political districts
 Illinois' 15th congressional district
 State House District 109
 State Senate District 55

References
 
 United States Census Bureau 2007 TIGER/Line Shapefiles
 United States National Atlas

External links
 City-Data.com
 Illinois State Archives

Townships in Crawford County, Illinois
Townships in Illinois